Leucophlebia vietnamensis is a moth of the family Sphingidae. It is known from Vietnam.

References

Leucophlebia
Moths of Asia
Endemic fauna of Vietnam
Moths described in 2003